Ken Bracken (24 August 1903 – 25 February 1978) was an  Australian rules footballer who played with North Melbourne in the Victorian Football League (VFL).

Notes

External links 

1903 births
1978 deaths
Australian rules footballers from New South Wales
North Melbourne Football Club players
St George AFC players